Ballinabrackey is a village in County Meath in Ireland. It is in the civil parish of Castlejordan. 

The ecclesiastical parish of Ballinabrackey is located between Kinnegad and Edenderry, and spans parts of County Meath and County Offaly. The local parish church, which was built , is in the Roman Catholic Diocese of Meath. 

Ballinabrackey GAA, the local Gaelic Athletic Association club, won the 2020 Meath Intermediate Football Championship.

References

Towns and villages in County Meath